Background music is a mode of musical performance chosen to affect behavioral and emotional responses.

Background Music may refer to:

Background Music (album), the 2001 debut album by the band Give Up the Ghost
"Background Music" (Maren Morris song), from her 2022 album Humble Quest
"Background Music" (Thomas Rhett song), from his 2015 album Tangled Up